Preban is a civil parish and townland in County Wicklow, Ireland.

References

External links
 Preban graveyard
 Uncovering Preban's forgotten heritage

Civil parishes of County Wexford
Townlands of County Wexford
Church of Ireland parishes in the Republic of Ireland